The London Emergency Services Liaison Panel (LESLP) consists of representatives from the following agencies:

Metropolitan Police Service
London Fire Brigade
City of London Police
British Transport Police
London Ambulance Service (NHS Trust)
HM Coastguard (London)
Port of London Authority
All London Local Authorities
Military (Joint Regional Liaison Officer)
Transport for London
London Resilience Group

Established in 1973, the group meets regularly and is chaired by the Metropolitan Police Service. The role of the LESLP is to establish the correct procedures for a collaborative approach to responding to major incidents within London. A major incident could be anything from a terrorist attack to a natural disaster.

A revised version of the LESLP Major Incident Procedure Manual (2019 edition) is published on the London Prepared webpages.

Major incident 

A "major incident" is defined by LESLP as "an event or situation with a range of serious consequences which requires special arrangements to be implemented by one or more emergency responder agency."

Definition of a "major incident" explanatory notes:

 'Emergency responder agency' describes all category one and two responders as defined in the Civil Contingencies Act (2004) and associated guidance.
 A major incident is beyond the scope of business-as-usual operations, and is likely to involve serious harm, damage, disruption or risk to human life or welfare, essential services, the environment or national security.
 A major incident may involve a single-agency response, although it is more likely to require a multi-agency response, which may be in the form of multi-agency support to a lead responder.
 The severity of the consequences associated with a major incident are likely to constrain or complicate the ability of responders to resource and manage the incident, although a major incident is unlikely to affect all responders equally.
 The decision to declare a major incident will always be a judgement made in a specific local and operational context, and there are no precise and universal thresholds or triggers. Where Local Resilience Forums and responders have explored these criteria in the local context and ahead of time, decision makers will be better informed and more confident in making that judgement.

This definition is different to the definition of an "Emergency", a related term defined in the Civil Contingencies Act 2004.

An example of the declaration of a major incident is the emergency system activated during the 7 July 2005 attacks on London.

Declaration of a major incident 

Declaring a 'major incident' triggers a response from each emergency service and other responder agencies. It takes time for operational structures, resources and protocols to be put in place. Declaring that a major incident is in progress as soon as possible means these arrangements can be put in place as quickly as possible.

A major incident may be declared by one or more emergency responder agency if any of the major incident criteria is satisfied. A major incident declaration will normally be declared by one of the emergency services. In certain circumstances, for example flooding, a local authority or other responder agency may declare a major incident.

It is important that all individuals who could be first on scene for their respective responder agency are able to declare a major incident, and that they understand the implications of declaring one.

A major incident declared by one emergency responder agency may not be so for another, however, each agency will attend with an appropriate response and notify relevant support organisations. This is so even if they are to be employed in a standby capacity and not directly involved in the incident.

Stages 

Major incidents are considered to have four stages, namely:

Initial Response
Consolidation Phase
Recovery Phase
Restoration of Normality

Co-ordinating groups 

In the event of a major incident, the formation of Strategic, Tactical and Operational co-ordinating groups (also known as Gold and Silver co-ordinating groups) will occur. These groups will be responsible for actions and co-ordination within their own spheres of activity.

References
The London Emergency Services Liaison Panel (LESLP) Major Incident Procedure Manual conforms to the Joint Emergency Services Interoperability Principles (JESIP) 'Joint Doctrine: The Interoperability Framework, Edition Two, 2016'.

External links 
 London Emergency Services Liaison Panel Website

Emergency services in England
Metropolitan Police

Emergency management in the United Kingdom
Local government in London